Bonnes may refer to:

 Bonnes, Charente, a commune in the department of Charente, France
 Bonnes, Vienne, a commune in the department of Vienne, France
 Étienne Bonnes (1894 – after 1924), French rugby union player who competed in the 1924 Summer Olympics
 Olivier Bonnes (born 1990), international footballer of Niger
 Stéphane Bonnes (born 1978), French former football player
 Les Bonnes (The Maids), a 1947 play by Jean Genet

See also
 Bonnes Mares, an Appellation d'origine contrôlée (AOC) and Grand Cru vineyard for red wine in the Côte de Nuits subregion of Burgundy
 Eaux-Bonnes, a commune in the Pyrénées-Atlantiques department in south-western France
 Les bonnes causes (Don't Tempt the Devil), a 1963 French-Italian crime film written and directed by Christian-Jaque
 Les Bonnes Femmes, a 1960 French comedic drama film directed by Claude Chabrol
 Bonne (disambiguation)